Tolppanen is a Finnish surname.

Geographical distribution
As of 2014, 90.3% of all known bearers of the surname Tolppanen were residents of Finland (frequency 1:11,404), 6.4% of Sweden (1:289,611) and 2.1% of Canada (1:3,345,273).

In Finland, the frequency of the surname was higher than national average (1:11,404) in the following regions:
 1. North Karelia (1:3,218)
 2. Lapland (1:3,398)
 3. Northern Savonia (1:3,404)
 4. Central Finland (1:6,866)
 5. Kainuu (1:8,960)
 6. Southern Savonia (1:9,537)

People
 Maria Tolppanen (born 1952), Finnish politicians
 Uniikki (born 1981), real name Dan Ahti Tolppanen, Finnish artist

References

Finnish-language surnames
Surnames of Finnish origin